The following list shows the chronological progression of the most expensive transfer in the history of the Serie A. All the buying teams are Italian.

The cost does not include the salary of the player, an aspect that in the last few decades the sports press usually merged.

However, the list is not complete, since in some cases between two consecutive transfers listed it is possible that there is a third one that for a period was the new record.

See also
 List of most expensive association football transfers
 Football in Italy

References

Serie A records and statistics
Expensive
Serie A